A Pyrrhic Existence is the seventh studio album by the British funeral doom band Esoteric. Just like the two previous albums before it, A Pyrrhic Existence is a double album. It was released on November 8, 2019 through Season of Mist.

A Pyrrhic Existence is Esoteric's final studio album featuring founding guitarist Gordon Bicknell, who left the band prior to its release.

Reception

A Pyrrhic Existence was released to positive reviews. Blabbermouth called lead single "Descent" an instant highlight, stating that when Greg Chandler's vocals "burst through the fog at the three-and-a-half-minute mark, it's like the voice of some fearsome, hateful deity resounding through thick storm clouds to the Earth below". Jerome Reuter of Metal Injection notably gave the album a perfect score commenting on how Esoteric have once again set the bar high by releasing a double album with no filler. He ended his review saying "A modern Greek tragedy told in six parts, it's nothing short of a theatrical masterpiece".

Accolades

Track listing

Personnel

Esoteric 
 Greg Chandler – vocals, guitars
 Gordon Bicknell – guitars
 Jim Nolan – guitars
 Mark Bodossian – bass
 Joe Fletcher – drums

Miscellaneous
 Lisa Schubert – cover art

References

External links
 A Pyrrhic Existence on Discogs
 A Pyrrhic Existence on Bandcamp

2019 albums
Esoteric (band) albums
Season of Mist albums